Ischnothele, also known as scatter-web spiders is a genus of spiders in the family Ischnothelidae. It was first described by Anton Ausserer in 1875.

Species
 it contained the following species:
Ischnothele annulata Tullgren, 1905 – Brazil, Bolivia, Paraguay, Argentina
Ischnothele caudata Ausserer, 1875 (type) – Mexico to Brazil
Ischnothele digitata (O. Pickard-Cambridge, 1892) – Mexico to El Salvador
Ischnothele garcia Coyle, 1995 – Hispaniola
Ischnothele goloboffi Coyle, 1995 – Peru
Ischnothele guianensis (Walckenaer, 1837) – Peru to Guyana
Ischnothele huambisa Coyle, 1995 – Peru
Ischnothele indicola Tikader, 1969 – India
Ischnothele jeremie Coyle, 1995 – Hispaniola
Ischnothele longicauda Franganillo, 1930 – Bahama Is., Cuba
Ischnothele reggae Coyle & Meigs, 1990 – Jamaica
Ischnothele xera Coyle & Meigs, 1990 – Jamaica

References

Mygalomorphae
Mygalomorphae genera
Taxa named by Anton Ausserer